Stefano Barrera (born 12 January 1980, in Siracusa) is an Italian foil fencer.

Biography
Barrera won the bronze medal for the foil 2006 World Fencing Championships after he lost 15-13 to Andrea Baldini in the semi final. Two years later, in the 2008 World Fencing Championships he won the team competition. He belongs to Centro Sportivo Carabinieri, but he also trains with A.S. Frascati Scherma. He won the bronze medal after a one-year and a half stop due to medical problems.

Achievements
 2008 World Fencing Championships, foil, team
 2006 World Fencing Championships, foil, individual
 1998 World Youth Fencing Championships, foil, individual
 1998 World Youth Fencing Championships, foil, team
 1997 World Cadet Fencing Championships, foil, individual
 1996 World Cadet Fencing Championships, foil, individual

External links
  Personal data

1980 births
Living people
Italian male fencers
Fencers of Centro Sportivo Carabinieri